Ratevo is a village in the Berovo Municipality of North Macedonia.

Demographics
According to the 2002 census, the village had a total of 844 inhabitants. Ethnic groups in the village include:

Macedonians 844

References

External links
 Visit Macedonia

Villages in Berovo Municipality